Dasht-e Kangari may refer to:
 Dasht-e Kangari, Mamasani
 Dasht-e Kangari, Mahvarmilani, Mamasani County